The 244th Aviation Regiment is an aviation regiment of the U.S. Army.

Structure
 1st Battalion (Assault) at Army Aviation Support Facility #1 at Hammond Northshore Regional Airport
 2rd Battalion (General Support) at Army Aviation Support Facility #2 at Esler Airfield
 Company F

References

244